

J04A Drugs for treatment of tuberculosis

J04AA Aminosalicylic acid and derivatives
J04AA01 Aminosalicylic acid
J04AA02 Sodium aminosalicylate
J04AA03 Calcium aminosalicylate

J04AB Antibiotics
J04AB01 Cycloserine
J04AB02 Rifampicin
J04AB03 Rifamycin
J04AB04 Rifabutin
J04AB05 Rifapentin
J04AB06 Enviomycin
J04AB30 Capreomycin

J04AC Hydrazides
J04AC01 Isoniazid
J04AC51 Isoniazid, combinations

J04AD Thiocarbamide derivatives
J04AD01 Protionamide
J04AD02 Tiocarlide
J04AD03 Ethionamide

J04AK Other drugs for treatment of tuberculosis
J04AK01 Pyrazinamide
J04AK02 Ethambutol
J04AK03 Terizidone
J04AK04 Morinamide
J04AK05 Bedaquiline
J04AK06 Delamanid
J04AK07 Amithiozone
J04AK08 Pretomanid

J04AM Combinations of drugs for treatment of tuberculosis
J04AM01 Streptomycin and isoniazid
J04AM02 Rifampicin and isoniazid
J04AM03 Ethambutol and isoniazid
J04AM04 Thioacetazone and isoniazid
J04AM05 Rifampicin, pyrazinamide and isoniazid
J04AM06 Rifampicin, pyrazinamide, ethambutol and isoniazid
J04AM07 Rifampicin, ethambutol and isoniazid
J04AM08 Isoniazid, sulfamethoxazole, trimethoprim and pyridoxine

J04B Drugs for treatment of lepra

J04BA Drugs for treatment of lepra
J04BA01 Clofazimine
J04BA02 Dapsone
J04BA03 Aldesulfone sodium
J04BA50 Dapsone and rifampicin
J04BA51 Dapsone, rifampicin and clofazimine

References

Tuberculosis
J04